Zurobata reticulata is a moth of the family Erebidae first described by Frederic Moore in 1882. It is found in India.

References

Boletobiinae
Moths of Asia
Moths described in 1882